Miel Louw (26 May 1933 – 8 December 2007, Leuven) was a Belgian journalist, television presenter, and writer. He worked for Vlaamse Radio- en Televisieomroeporganisatie (VRT) for 32 years.

Louw began his career in 1961, and worked as a news journalist in radio and television. He reported for the current affairs series Echo from 1968  to 1974 and the consumer documentary series Wikken en wegen from 1974 until 1979. He retired in 1993 and died of lung cancer in 2007 at the age of 74.

References

External links
 

Belgian radio journalists
Belgian television journalists
Flemish journalists
Flemish television writers
Flemish television presenters
Male television writers
1933 births
2007 deaths
20th-century screenwriters
20th-century Belgian journalists